Gaia Cauchi M.Q.R. (born 19 November 2002) is a Maltese singer. She represented Malta at the Junior Eurovision Song Contest 2013 and won the contest with her song "The Start".

Life and career

2004–2012: Early career
Gaia's first "international gig" came in 2011 when she appeared on the popular Italian TV show, Ti Lascio Una Canzone. She took on Tina Turner's "Proud Mary" and left the audience shouting "bellissimo!" She won the prestigious Sanremo Junior Music Festival a year later in her category when she was just nine years old. There, she sang "One Night Only", from Dreamgirls.

2013–present: Junior Eurovision Song Contest and breakthrough

After a two-year break from the contest, PBS (Public Broadcasting Services) decided to return to the Junior Eurovision. PBS, Malta's national broadcaster went for an internal selection and chose Cauchi to represent the island nation. Cauchi won the contest on 30 November with a 9-point lead over Ukraine. Being the winner of the Junior Eurovision, she was given a trophy which was incidentally broken few minutes after being awarded, when the contingent had a group hug. She became the first singer from Malta to win the Junior Eurovision Song Contest and the first person from the island nation to win an EBU produced competition.

On 2 December 2013, the Prime Minister Joseph Muscat announced that Cauchi would be awarded the order Xirka Ġieħ ir-Repubblika, the country's highest honour. This move generated controversy, and she and her team were given the Midalja għall-Qadi tar-Repubblika instead on 13 December 2013.

Cauchi made an appearance in the Eurovision Song Contest 2014 performing part of her winning song. At the Junior Eurovision Song Contest 2014 contest, Cauchi performed during the interval act and delivered the "Kids' Jury" points.

In 2018, Cauchi auditioned for the 15th series of The X-Factor. She was placed in the group "Sweet Sense". On 13 October 2018, Judge Robbie Williams sent Sweet Sense, including Gaia, home from the Judges' Houses round.

In 2019, she released her single 'Why Should I'. Cauchi has also been nominated for 3 awards at the Malta Music Awards.

Discography

Singles

As lead artist

As featured artist

Other charted songs

References

External links

 Gaia Cauchi - Participant Profile on the official site of the Junior Eurovision Song Contest

2002 births
Living people
Maltese child singers
21st-century Maltese women singers
21st-century Maltese singers
Recipients of Midalja għall-Qadi tar-Repubblika
Junior Eurovision Song Contest winners
Junior Eurovision Song Contest entrants for Malta
People from Mġarr